Mojca Suhadolc (born 7 January 1975 in Vrhnika, SR Slovenia, SFR Yugoslavia) is a Slovenian former alpine skier.

Suhadolc competed in FIS World Cup in years 1992-2005. She won one race, in Super G, in Lake Louise (Canada) in 1999. In 1999/2000 season, she finished third in Super G final standings. Besides, she won 4 podiums at World Cup races.

Suhadolc represented Slovenia at the 1998 and 2002 Winter Olympics.

World Cup results

Season standings

Race podiums

References 

1975 births
Living people
Slovenian female alpine skiers
Olympic alpine skiers of Slovenia
Alpine skiers at the 1998 Winter Olympics
Alpine skiers at the 2002 Winter Olympics
People from Vrhnika